Fatal Lady is a 1936 American musical mystery film directed by Edward Ludwig and starring Walter Pidgeon, Mary Ellis and Ruth Donnelly. It recorded a loss of $296,665.

The film's sets were designed by art director Alexander Toluboff.

Plot
When opera singer Marion Stuart (Mary Ellis) is questioned regarding the death of a friend she escapes to Brazil.

Cast
 Mary Ellis as Marion Stuart / Maria Delasano / Malevo
 Walter Pidgeon as David Roberts
 John Halliday as Martan Fontes
 Ruth Donnelly as Melba York
 Alan Mowbray as Uberto Malla
 Guy Bates Post as Feodor Glinka
 Samuel S. Hinds as Guili Ruffano
 Norman Foster as Phillip Roberts
 Edgar Kennedy as Rudolf Hochstetter
 Jean Rouverol as Anita
 Virginia Lee as Brazilian Opera Troupe

References

External links

1936 films
Films directed by Edward Ludwig
1936 mystery films
American mystery films
Films produced by Walter Wanger
American black-and-white films
Films set in Brazil
Paramount Pictures films
1930s American films